This article summarises results of the 17 October 2020 New Zealand general election, including both party vote and electorate vote outcomes.

Release of results 
Preliminary results were released gradually after polling booths closed at 19:00 (NZDT) on 17 October. The preliminary count only includes advance ordinary and election day ordinary votes; it does not include any special votes, which have a deadline ten days later (27 October). Special votes include votes from those who enrolled after the deadline of 13 September, those who voted outside their electorate (including all overseas votes), voters in hospital or prison, and those voters enrolled on the unpublished roll. The votes in the cannabis referendum and the euthanasia referendum were counted after election day, with preliminary results released on 30 October.

All voting papers, counterfoils and electoral rolls are returned to the electorate's returning officer for a mandatory recount; this also includes approving and counting any special votes, and compiling a master roll to ensure no voter has voted more than once. To simplify processing and counting, overseas votes will be sent to and counted at the Electoral Commission's central processing centre in Wellington, rather than to electorate returning officers. Official results, including all recounted ordinary votes and special votes, as well as the official results of the two referendums, are expected to be released by the Electoral Commission on 6 November 2020.

Parties and candidates have three working days after the release of the official results to apply for a judicial recount. These recounts take place under the auspices of a District Court judge (the Chief District Court Judge in case of a nationwide recount), and may delay the return of the election writ by a few days.

Party vote 

| colspan=12 align=center| 
|- style="text-align:center;"
! colspan=2 rowspan=2 style="width:213px;" | Party
! colspan=4 | Party vote
! colspan=4 | Electorate vote sum
! rowspan=2 | Totalseats
! rowspan=2 | +/-
|- style="text-align:center;"
! Votes
! %
! Change(pp)
! Seats
! Votes
! %
! Change(pp)
! Seats
|-
| 
| 1,443,545
| 50.01
| 13.12
| 19
| 1,357,501
| 48.07
| 10.19
| 46
| 65
| 19
|-
| 
| 738,275
| 25.58
| 18.87
| 10
| 963,845
| 34.13
| 9.92
| 23
| 33
| 23
|-
| 

| 226,757
| 7.86
| 1.59
| 9
| 162,245
| 5.74
| 1.17
| 1
| 10
| 2
|-
| 

| 219,031
| 7.59
| 7.08
| 9
| 97,697
| 3.46
| 2.45
| 1
| 10
| 9

|-
| 
| 75,020
| 2.60
| 4.60
| 0
| 30,209
| 1.07
| 4.38
| 0
| 0
| 9
|-
|  (TOP)

| 43,449
| 1.51
| 0.94
| 0
| 25,181
| 0.89
| 0.14
| 0
| 0
| 
|-
| 
| 42,613
| 1.48	
| 1.24
| 0
| 49,598
| 1.76
| 1.52
| 0
| 0
| 
|-
| 

| 33,630
| 1.17
| 0.01
| 1
| 60,837
| 2.15
| 0.04
| 1
| 2
| 2
|-
| 
| 28,429
| 0.98
| new
| 0
| 25,054
| 0.89
| new
| 0
| 0
| new
|-
| 
| 13,329
| 0.46
| 0.15
| 0
| 8,044
| 0.28
| 0.12
| 0
| 0
| 
|-
| 

| 8,121
| 0.28
| new
| 0
| 6,830
| 0.24
| new
| 0
| 0
| new
|-
| 
| 4,237
| 0.15
| new
| 0
| 2,139
| 0.08
| new
| 0
| 0
| new
|-
| 
| 3,256
| 0.11
| 0.05
| 0
| 7,982
| 0.28
| 0.23
| 0
| 0
| 
|-
| 

| 2,414
| 0.08
| new
| 0
| 2,764
| 0.10
| new
| 0
| 0
| new
|-
| 
| 1,880
| 0.07
| new
| 0
| 2,421
| 0.09
| new
| 0
| 0
| new
|-
| 
| 1,520
| 0.05
| 0.02
| 0
| 2,699
| 0.11
| 0.09
| 0
| 0
| 
|-
| 
| 914
| 0.03
| new
| 0
| 8,462
| 0.30
| new
| 0
| 0
| new
|-
| style="background-color:#ffffff" |
| style="text-align:left;" |Unregistered parties
| —
| —
| —
| —
| 3,391
| 0.12
| 0.08
| 0
| 0
| 
|-
| 
| —
| —
| —
| —
| 7,299
| 0.26
| 0.24
| 0
| 0
| 
|-
! colspan=2 style="text-align:left;" | Valid votes

! 2,886,420
! 98.88
! 0.34
!
! 2,824,198
! 96.75
! 0.58
! Colspan=3 |
|-
| colspan=2 style="text-align:left;" | Informal votes
| 21,372
| 0.73
| 0.32
!
| 57,138
| 1.96
| 0.80
| Colspan=3 |
|-
| colspan=2 style="text-align:left;" | Disallowed votes
| 11,281
| 0.39
| 0.66
!
| 37,737
| 2.66
| 1.37
| Colspan=3 |
|-
| colspan=2 style="text-align:left;" | Below electoral threshold
| 225,182
| 7.71
| 
!
| —
| —
| —
| Colspan=3 |
|-
! colspan=2 style="text-align:left;" | Total
! 2,919,073
! 100
!
! 48
! 2,919,073
! 100
!
! 72
! 120
!
|-
| colspan=2 style="text-align:left;" | Eligible voters and Turnout
| 3,549,580
| 82.24
| 2.49
!
| 3,549,580
| 82.24
| 2.49
| Colspan=3 |
|}

Party vote by electorate
The following is a breakdown of the party vote received in each electorate, for parties receiving at least 1% of the nationwide party vote.

Electorate vote 
The table below shows the results of the 2020 general election:

Key

</div>

|-

|-
 | colspan=10 style="background-color:#FFDEAD;text-align:left;" | Māori electorates
|-

|}

List results

MP changes 
Based on preliminary results, there were 40 new MPs: 22 for Labour, 5 for National, 9 for ACT, 3 for the Greens, and 1 for the Māori Party. When final results were announced on 6 November, this rose to 42 new members, the two additional new members being Emily Henderson (Labour) and Debbie Ngarewa-Packer (Māori).

Footnotes

References 

2020 New Zealand general election
Election results in New Zealand